Beatriz Sánchez may refer to:
Beatriz Sánchez (basketball), Spanish basketball player (born 1989)
Beatriz Sánchez (journalist), Chilean journalist and presidential candidate (born 1970)